Living Fire is a Punk Rock / Hard Core band based in San Paulo, Brazil / Los Angeles, California which the main goal is transmitting the message of the Cross through positive lyrics.

History
Getting a positive message through impactful lyrics and in the vibrant style of punk rock/hardcore has always been the goal of LIVING FIRE.

The Brazilian band was formed in 2005 in the city of São Paulo and, in the beginning, had the name of PUNKIDS.  After some research, Luís Medeiros (founder of the band) found at least two other bands with the same name and decided to change the name to I.N.C.  (In Name Of Christ).

The project did not have a fixed line up and in each event, different musicians were invited to play;  except for the bass and vocals always played by Luis Medeiros.

Luis Carlos states that “... at the beginning it was just for fun, I wanted to record an album just to have songs that I would like to listen to.  I didn't know that English lyrics would have such an impact even if I sang with my “awful accent”.

I.N.C.'s first album was recorded independently in 2006 and copies were distributed free of charge at the band's events.

In 2011, Luís, who also played bass with Brother Simion and with the band Judas O Outro, talks to music producer Michel Oliveira and decides to re-record the band's first album, which now happens to be called LIVING FIRE.

The album JESUS RULES began recording in July 2011, featuring the opening track called JESUS IS NOT DEAD and two more covers songs were added to the album: OLD RUGGED CROSS (a classic of the Christian music) and ONE WAY (perhaps  the best known Hillsong United song).

In July 2012 LIVING FIRE signed with the American label THUMPER PUNK RECORDS, established in the city of Capitola / California, which has always promoted American HardCore and Punk Rock bands, being LIVING FIRE, the first band outside the United States to sign a contract with this record label.

In November 2012 the band released the music video for the song COME WITH US.  The video shows the joy and friendship in an event that was marked by having been recorded in a “barbecue on the slab”. In this event the band played a live concert on the rooftop of a house for more than 50 people.

In November 2013 the band also released the music video for the song JESUS IS NOT DEAD, which was recorded live and brought together more than 500 people from the most diverse cultural tribes to a church, most of them stated that: "never knew that going to church could be fun".

Two years after the release of their first album, in September 2014, the band's second album was released, which “shows the maturity of the band within the proposed musical style, but without losing the adrenaline of the first”.

This new album called DEAD TO SIN, brings for the first time a track with lyrics in Portuguese (INDESCRITÍVEL AMOR) that was written by Mônica Oliveira, wife of Luis Medeiros. In addition they recorded the song JCHC, a cover from OFFICER NEGATIVE, one of the most traditional hardcore bands of the Southern California.

After the birth of his child in November 2014, Luís decided to stay only with the band's vocals and invited Raphael Alcântara, member of the band Seven Seals of the Apocalypse, to take on the bass, and this gave more creative freedom in the compositions of the third album.

The album O ETERNO AGORA was released in March 2016 and is the first with all lyrics in Portuguese, in addition to being the first album of the band with completely free distribution, exceeding 20 thousand downloads.

In August 2017, the band released their fourth album entitled EVERY SAINT HAS A PAST, EVERY SINNER HAS A FUTURE, being perhaps the band's most worked album, with more melodic guitars and drum lines which reminds Blink 182. In the week of its release, the album became the most downloaded from the label's bandcamp and made it into the top 10 until December 2017.

LIVING FIRE's first four albums have similarities between them, but each has a unique style.  And THE FLAME STILL BURNS the fifth album of the band was released in June 2019 and brings a strong influence from NYHC and Nude Metal.

Less than a month after the release of their fifth album, LIVING FIRE goes on a hiatus when Luís decides to move to Los Angeles due to family problems.

After almost two years stopped and in the middle of the Covid-19 pandemic, LIVING FIRE returns, in May 2021, to record a new album called MERCY BETWEEN LOVE AND HATE with influences from NYHC, New Metal and RAP.  This album marks the 10-year career of the band which began to play just for fun and had influenced the Brazilian Christian underground scene, opening the doors for other bands to reach expression outside of Brazil.

Members

Current Member: Luis Medeiros vocals/bass

Former Members:

 Raphael Alcântara - bass (Seven Seals of the Apocalypse
Wesley Farina -  guitar
 Murillo Xavier - guitar (MHX Chronicles)
 Michel Oliveira - drums/guitar (M.O. Project)
Thiago Damasceno - guitar (Darak)

Discography
Studio albums
 Jesus Rules (May 14, 2012, Thumper Punk Records)
 Dead to Sin (August 30, 2014, Thumper Punk Records)
O Eterno Agora ( March 28, 2016, Thumper Punk Records)
Every Saint Has a Past, Every Sinner Has a Future ( October 3, 2017, Thumper Punk Records)
The Flame Still Burns (May 22, 2019, Thumper Punk Records)
Mercy Between Love and Hate  (upcoming in 2021 , Thumper Punk Records)

Single 

Skinheads in the Church ( June 16, 2014, Thumper Punk Records)

References

External links
Official website

Brazilian hardcore punk groups
Christian hardcore musical groups
Musical groups established in 2006